Mount Olivet Cemetery is a Roman Catholic cemetery located in Chicago, Illinois.  The cemetery is operated by the Archdiocese of Chicago.  The cemetery is located at 2755 West 111th Street.

History
Mount Olivet was consecrated in 1885, and was the first Catholic cemetery to be established in the south side of Chicago. There are over 142,200 people buried at the cemetery, with over 150 annual interments. It became one of the first major area cemeteries to become full, until the purchase and development of additional lands along what had been the eastern border of the cemetery.

Mount Olivet was the original burial location of Al Capone, who was laid to rest between the graves of his father and brother.  A few years after his death, the remains of all three men were moved to Mount Carmel Cemetery in Hillside, Illinois upon the death of Capone's mother.

Notable burials
 James M. Bell, Sgt. during Battle of Little Big Horn
 Al Capone, gangster (remains later moved to Mount Carmel Cemetery (Hillside, Illinois))
 Thomas A. Doyle, U.S. Congressman
 Charles Martin, U.S. Congressman
 Lawrence E. McGann, U.S. Congressman
 M. Alfred Michaelson, U.S. Congressman
 P. H. Moynihan, U.S. Congressman
 Catherine O'Leary, owner of cow who allegedly started the Great Chicago Fire
 Daniel Ryan Sr., politician who served as president of the Cook County Board of Commissioners
 One British Commonwealth war grave of a Canadian soldier of World War I.
 Zachary Taylor Davis, architect of Comiskey Park and Wrigley Field

See also
 List of cemeteries in Cook County, Illinois

References

External links
 Catholic Cemeteries of Chicago
 Mount Olivet Cemetery
 

1855 establishments in Illinois
Cemeteries in Chicago
Roman Catholic cemeteries in Illinois